The TCA Heritage Award is an award given by the Television Critics Association.

Winners and nominees

References

External links
 Official website

Heritage
Awards established in 2002